During the 2000–01 English football season, Wimbledon F.C. competed in the Football League First Division, following relegation from the FA Premier League the previous season.

Season summary
Following the departures of key frontmen John Hartson and Carl Cort, Wimbledon were unable to make an immediate return to the top flight and finished in 8th, five points short of the playoffs; were it not for their mediocre home form (with 11 draws and only 7 wins all season) they could have aimed for a playoff spot or even an attempt for automatic promotion. Despite this disappointing season, Wimbledon did enjoy some highlights, including a 5–0 win of London rivals Queens Park Rangers at home and a 5–0 win over Sheffield Wednesday at Hillsborough.

Wimbledon's struggle to return to the top flight was only made harder with the sale of the club's top scorer, Jason Euell, to South London rivals Charlton Athletic at the end of the season.

Kit
German company Puma became Wimbledon's kit manufacturers. Tiny Computers remained the kit sponsor.

Final league table

Results
Wimbledon's score comes first

Legend

Football League First Division

FA Cup

League Cup

Players

First-team squad
Squad at end of season

Left club during season

Reserve squad

Appearances and goals
Source:
Numbers in parentheses denote appearances as substitute.
Players with names struck through and marked  left the club during the playing season.
Players with names in italics and marked * were on loan from another club for the whole of their season with Wimbledon.
Players listed with no appearances have been in the matchday squad but only as unused substitutes.
Key to positions: GK – Goalkeeper; DF – Defender; MF – Midfielder; FW – Forward

References

Notes

External links
 Historical Wimbledon F.C. kits

Wimbledon F.C. seasons
Wimbledon